"Rome Antics" is a 1975 episode of the British comedy television series The Goodies.

Written by The Goodies, with songs and music by Bill Oddie.

Plot
In Queen Boadicea's Britain, the Ancient Goodies are wearing animal skins, and Graeme's spectacle frames are made from wooden twigs. They live in a small one-room stone house, which is very dark, and, so that they can have extra light in their house, Graeme smashes some of the stones out from a wall with a club to make a hole.

The Romans are gradually taking over Britain, and even Tim states that the Romans' woad is better quality than the British woad is. Graeme and Bill are horrified at Tim's approval of Roman woad and refuse to touch the stuff — but Tim puts the Roman woad onto his face, anyway.

A Roman ambassador arrives at their house on 'foot', and the Goodies hide from him.  The ambassador, however, turns out to be a messenger, and he comments that the Emperor wants the Goodies to go to Rome. The Goodies attempt to ride to Rome on their wooden trandem, but they have trouble with the trandem so they travel to Rome on foot, instead. When they come to a crossroad, with three roads diverging from the one they are on, they are undecided as to which road they should take. However, there is a signpost with the word "Rome" pointing to each of the three roads. Also, the Goodies have a map with the words "All roads lead to Rome", so they decide to take different routes from each other — finally ending up at exactly the same spot as each other, at exactly the same time.

In Rome, the Emperor goes onto a balcony to talk to his subjects, but the Romans do not want to listen to him, and throw fruit and vegetables at him (which the Emperor then picks up a cucumber and, looking at the people outside the Palace, he asks them: "Did you throw that? … Cheeky!").

The Emperor meets the Goodies and tells them that he wants them to take over the entertainment. When the Emperor later complains about his life, Tim comments that he would like to be Emperor — so the Emperor hands over the position to Tim (who immediately sets up vacation areas all over Rome and intends to invite people from all over to come to Rome).  Graeme, who is in charge of entertainment, arranges it, including sending out invitations to people from other lands to come to Rome.

Meanwhile, the Vandals, who have also received the Goodies' invitation to go to Rome, are on the move, burning and pillaging everything in their wake. The Vandals are led by the ferocious and fearsome "Attila the Hun".

The Goodies go to the Colosseum to entertain the spectators, including throwing hoops onto nails, and, in so doing, inadvertently inventing the five Olympic Rings. The Vandals arrive and the Goodies make a hasty retreat away from the area, with Tim carrying a lit torch so they can see their way. As the Goodies run through the streets of Rome, the flaming torch burns clothes, which are hanging on clotheslines. Emperor Tim also finds a violin in a glass case, with the words "Break glass in case of fire".  Following the instructions, Tim opens instead of breaking the glass and removes the violin, which he then plays — while, in the distance, the fire, which was accidentally started by Tim's torch, takes hold and burns Rome.

As they run away, life holds one final surprise for the Ancient Goodies.

Cultural references
Attila the Hun — who was the most powerful of the kings of Huns
 Nero
 Colosseum
 Olympic rings
 Olympic torch
 Venus de Milo

References

 "The Complete Goodies" — Robert Ross, B T Batsford, London, 2000
 "The Goodies Rule OK" — Robert Ross, Carlton Books Ltd, Sydney, 2006
 "From Fringe to Flying Circus — 'Celebrating a Unique Generation of Comedy 1960-1980'" — Roger Wilmut, Eyre Methuen Ltd, 1980
 "The Goodies Episode Summaries" — Brett Allender
 "The Goodies — Fact File" — Matthew K. Sharp

External links
 

The Goodies (series 5) episodes
1975 British television episodes
Fiction set in Roman Britain